Year 1281 (MCCLXXXI) was a common year starting on Wednesday (link will display the full calendar) of the Julian calendar.

Events 
 By place 

 Byzantine Empire 
 Spring – Siege of Berat: A Byzantine relief force under Michael Tarchaneiotes arrives at the strategically important citadel of Berat. Tarchaneiotes avoids a confrontation with the Angevines and relies on ambushes and raids instead. He manages to capture the Angevin commander, Hugh of Sully, a few of Sully's guards escape and reach their camp – where they report his capture. Panic spreads among the Angevin troops at this news and they begin to flee towards Avlon. The Byzantines take advantage of their disordered flight and attacked, joined by the troops in the besieged citadel. Tarchaneiotes takes an enormous booty, a small remnant of the Angevin army manages to cross the Vjosa River and reach the safety of Kanina. 
 October 18 – Emperor Michael VIII (Palaiologos) is excommunicated by Pope Martin IV without any warning or provocation. Michael has re-established his rule in Constantinople, and authorizes Charles I, king of Sicily, to make a Crusade against the Papal States. Charles prepares an expedition in Sicily and assembles a fleet of 100 ships, and 300 more in Naples, Provence, and the Greek territories, which carry some 8,000 cavalrymen.

 Europe 
 June – Castilian forces led King Alfonso X (the Wise) and accompanied by his sons, the Infantes Sancho, Peter and John, invade the lowlands of Granada. Sultan Muhammad II sends a Moorish army, supported by many archers and cavalry, to repel them. Alfonso defeats the Moors in a battle near Granada's walls on June 25, but after the failure of the negotiations that follow, he leaves Granada.
 July 3 – Treaty of Orvieto: Charles I, Giovanni Dandolo, doge of Venice, and Philip I, Latin emperor, make an agreement to recover the Latin Empire. The treaty is signed in the Papal Palace, which Martin IV has moved to Orvieto after Viterbo is placed under an interdict for imprisoning two cardinals. 

 Middle East  
 September – Two Mongol armies (some 50,000 men) advance into Syria. One, is commanded by Abaqa Khan – who attacks the Mamluk fortresses along the Euphrates frontier. The second one, led by his brother Möngke Temür makes contact with Leo III, king of Cilician Armenia, and then marches down through Aintab and Aleppo into the Orontes valley. Where he is joined by knights of the Hospitaller Order and some French mercenaries. Meanwhile, Sultan Qalawun assembles his Mamluk forces at Damascus.
 October 29 – Battle of Homs: In a pitched battle, Mamluk forces (some 30,000 men) led by Qalawun destroy the Mongol center, Möngke Temür is wounded and flees. He orders a retreat, followed by a disorganized army. The Armenian-Georgian auxiliaries under Leo III fight their way back northwards. The Mongol army recrosses the Euphrates without losses, the river remains the frontier between the Mongols and the Mamluk Sultanate.
 Osman I, founder of the Ottoman Empire, becomes bey of the Söğüt tribe in central Anatolia after the death of his father, Ertuğrul Ghazi. Osman's accession to power is not peaceful, as he has to fight his relatives before he gets hold of the clan's leadership. One of Osman's major rivals is his uncle Dündar Bey, who rebels against him.

 Asia 
 August 15 – Battle of Kōan (or Second Battle of Hakata Bay): A second Mongol invasion of Japan is foiled, as a large typhoon – famously called a kamikaze, or divine wind – destroys much of the combined Mongol and Chinese fleet and forces, numbering over 140,000 men and 4,000 ships. Later, Kublai Khan begins to gather forces to prepare for a third invasion attempt, but is distracted by events in Southeast and Central Asia.
 Kublai Khan orders the burning of sacred Taoist texts, resulting in the reduction in number of volumes of the Daozang (Taoist Canon) from 4,565 to 1,120.
 The Mon Kingdom of Hariphunchai falls, as its capital Lamphun (in modern-day Thailand) is captured by King Mangrai's Lannathai Kingdom.

 By topic 

 Markets 
 Guy of Dampierre, count of Flanders, licenses the first Lombard merchants to open a changing business in his realm.

 Religion 
 February 22 – Frenchman Simon de Brion succeeds Nicholas III, as Martin IV, and becomes the 189th pope of the Catholic Church.

Births 
 August 4 – Külüg Khan (or Wuzong), Mongol emperor (d. 1311)
 December 25 – Alice de Lacy, English noblewoman (d. 1348)
 Agnes of Austria, queen of Hungary (House of Árpád) (d. 1364)
 Castruccio Castracani, Italian nobleman and knight (d. 1328)
 Hamdallah Mustawfi, Persian official and historian (d. 1340)
 Henry of Lancaster, English nobleman and knight (d. 1345)
 Joan Butler (or FitzGerald), countess of Carrick (d. 1320)
 John Harington, English nobleman and politician (d. 1347)
 John Stonor, English lawyer and Chief Justice (d. 1354)
 Orhan Ghazi, Turkish ruler of the Ottoman Empire (d. 1362)
 Nizamüddin Ahmed Pasha, Ottoman statesmen (d. 1380)
 Richard Grey, English nobleman and diplomat (d. 1335)
 Rudolf I, king of Bohemia (House of Habsburg) (d. 1307)
 Sancia of Majorca, queen and regent of Naples (d. 1345)
 Yuri III Danilovich, Grand Prince of Vladimir (d. 1325)
 Zhu Shizhen, founder of the Ming Dynasty (d. 1344)

Deaths 
 February 16 – Gertrude of Hohenberg, queen of Germany (b. 1225)
 March 20 – Chabi, Mongol empress and wife of Kublai Khan (b. 1225)
 March 30 – Conrad of Mure, Swiss monk, scholar and writer (b. 1210)
 April 4 – Maurice de Berkeley, English nobleman and knight (b. 1218) 
 September 10 – John II, margrave of Brandenburg-Stendal (b. 1237)
 September 20 – Reinhard I, German nobleman and knight (b. 1225)
 October 8 – Constance of Greater Poland, Polish princess (b. 1245)
 December 24 – Henry V (the Great), count of Luxembourg (b. 1216)
 Alfonso Fernández el Niño, Spanish nobleman and prince (b. 1243)
 Anna of Hungary, Byzantine empress (House of Árpád) (b. 1260)
 Bruno von Schauenburg, German bishop, advisor and diplomat
 Ertuğrul Ghazi, Turkish ruler of the Sultanate of Rum (b. 1198)
 Sheikh Yusof Sarvestani, Persian astronomer and calligrapher
 Xu Heng, Chinese scholar, official and philosopher (b. 1209)

References